Dongo is a  comune in the Province of Como in the Italian region Lombardy. It lies on the northwestern shore of Lake Como between Gravedona and Musso at the mouth of the Albano.

It was in Dongo, on 27 April 1945, that Benito Mussolini and other  fascists, fleeing from Milan towards Valtellina, were captured by Urbano Lazzaro and other partisans.

Dongo borders the following municipalities: Colico, Consiglio di Rumo, Garzeno, Germasino, Musso, Pianello del Lario, Stazzona.

Main sights

Palazzo del Vescovo
The Palazzo del Vescovo (Palace of the Bishop) was erected in the 17th century by the family of the Marquis Cossoni. In 1854, Carlo Romanò, the Bishop of Como, acquired the building from the Cossoni family.

In 1983 the Town of Dongo purchased the building. The citizens of Dongo, assisted financially by the Comunità Montana Alto Lario Occidentale, initiated the complete restoration of the Palazzo shortly thereafter.

Still bearing its original name, the building currently houses the Civic Institute of Music "Alto Lario",  and, since December 2003, the International Piano Academy Lake Como.

Palazzo Manzi
The Palazzo Manzi, facing across the main square on the lake front, now serves as the Municipio (centre of civic administration) for the comune.  Its ground floor houses the Museo della Fine della Guerra (Museum of the end of the war), reopened after refurbishment in April 2014 and formerly known as the Museo della Resistenza (Museum of the resistance).  The museum provides audio and visual displays relating to the partisan movement in Dongo and the north Como area from the time of the Italian armistice in September 1943 up to the end of the war, and more specifically to the capture of Mussolini and other fascist leaders at Dongo in April 1945, and their subsequent execution.

Twin towns
Dongo is twinned with Arromanches-les-Bains in Normandy.

References

External links
 Official website
 Website of the Museo della Fine della Guerra

Cities and towns in Lombardy